Lot 8 is a township in Prince County, Prince Edward Island, Canada.  It is part of Halifax Parish. Lot 8 was awarded to Arnold Nisbett (M.P.) in the 1767 land lottery, passed to William Kilpatrick and Benjamin Todd in 1775, and to Todd's heirs in 1783.

It is known for the West Point Lighthouse at Cedar Dunes Provincial Park in West Point.  It is also known for approximately 55 large windmills, operated by the French company Suez Energy, which is used to create electricity for sale in New England.

Communities

Incorporated municipalities:

 none

Civic address communities:

 Dunblane
 Glenwood
 Hebron
 Knutsford
 Milburn
 Milo
 Mount Royal
 Springfield West
 West Cape
 West Point

References

08
Geography of Prince County, Prince Edward Island